Yuko Munakata is a professor of psychology at the University of Colorado Boulder. She has specialized in developmental cognitive neuroscience, taking a connectionist approach to cognitive development. Her research investigates the processing mechanisms underlying cognitive development, using converging evidence from behavior, computational modeling, and cognitive neuroscience. She also focuses on understanding the prevalence of task-dependent behaviors during the first years of life. Munakata received a B.S. in symbolic systems at Stanford University in 1991 and a PhD in psychology at Carnegie Mellon University in 1996 under James McClelland; and completed a postdoctoral fellowship at the Massachusetts Institute of Technology from 1996–1997. She worked at the University of Denver from 1997–2001, and joined the faculty of the University of Colorado Boulder in 2002, but continues to work at DU as an adjunct professor of psychology. Munakata is a member of the Institute of Cognitive Sciences and the Center for Neuroscience at CU.

References

External links

American women psychologists
Developmental psychologists
American cognitive neuroscientists
Cognitive development researchers
American women academics
American women scientists
Stanford University alumni
Carnegie Mellon University alumni
University of Colorado faculty
University of Denver faculty
Year of birth missing (living people)
Living people